Tang Pengju (born January 12, 1957) is a retired Chinese football player. He is the assistant coach at China Super League side Guangzhou Pharmaceutical.

Playing career
Pengju used to play for the Shaanxi Team, Beijing Budui, Beijing Team, and was regarded as one of the best right midfielders in China.

Management career
After retiring Tang would soon move into management and despite his youth and inexperience his former club the Beijing Team decided to give him his first management position in 1988. One of his first assignments was to guide the club back into the top tier and he achieved this in the 1990 Chinese league season after the club won the division title. After an impressive season that saw the club finish third in their return into the top flight in the 1991 league season expectations would start to arise from the club. This would continue when the Chinese Football Association started to demand that the league become fully professional and Beijing became the countries first professional team after the CITIC Group took over the club. With significant investment from the owners and despite having Chinese internationals in Gao Hongbo, Cao Xiandong and Gao Feng Tang's authoritarian leadership could not get the best from his players and he left in 1994.

Honours

Player
Beijing Team
Chinese Jia-A League: 1984

Manager
Beijing Guoan
Chinese Jia-B League: 1990

References

1957 births
Living people
People from Xianyang
Chinese footballers
Footballers from Shaanxi
Chinese football managers
Beijing Guoan F.C. players
Beijing Guoan F.C. managers
Changchun Yatai F.C. managers
Association football midfielders